Fabrizio (Fabrice) Garattoni is an Italian former competitive figure skater. After competing for France early in his career, he switched to Italy in 1992 and became a four-time national champion from 1993-96. He competed in several European and World Championships.

Results

References
 skatabase

Italian male single skaters
Living people
Year of birth missing (living people)